The charming climbing mouse (Rhipidomys venustus) is a species of nocturnal rodent in the family Cricetidae.
It endemic to Venezuela.

References

Rhipidomys
Mammals described in 1900
Taxa named by Oldfield Thomas
Taxonomy articles created by Polbot